The Salomon Ludwig Steinheim Institute of German-Jewish Studies is a research institute of the University of Duisburg-Essen whose research focuses on the cultural and religious history as well as the history of literature and events of the Jewish community in German-speaking areas. The institute has made contributions in teaching in the field of Jewish Studies at the University of Duisburg-Essen. In 2003, the faculty was transferred to the Heinrich Heine University of Düsseldorf and cooperation with the institute has been maintained.

Publications 
Kalonymos
Netiva
Zutot
Minima Judaica
Haskala name derived from Haskala.
Menora name based on Menorah

External links 
 Salomon Ludwig Steinheim Institute for German-Jewish Studies 
 Salomon Ludwig Steinheim Institute for German-Jewish Studies Salomon Ludwig Steinheim Institute for German-Jewish Studies 
 Steinheim-Institut on the German Wikipedia

Judaic studies
Jewish studies research institutes
Jewish schools in Germany